Eliza Atkins Gleason (December 15, 1909 – December 15, 2009) was the first African American to receive a doctorate in Library Science. In 1941, she established and became the first Dean of the School of Library Service at Atlanta University and created a library education program that trained 90 percent of all African-American librarians by 1986.

Education  
Gleason was born in Winston-Salem, North Carolina, to Simon Green Atkins and Olenona Pegram Atkins. Both of her parents were educators; her mother was a teacher and her father was the founder and first president of Slater State College, now Winston-Salem State University.

After receiving her bachelor's degree from the University of Illinois in 1931, she took her first library job in Louisville, Kentucky, at Louisville Municipal College, which was known as Municipal College for Negroes, where she soon became the head librarian, following in the footsteps of her sister, Olie Atkins Carpenter, who was a librarian at this institution, as well.  

In 1936, Gleason received her master's from the University of California, Berkeley and moved to Chicago where she received her Ph.D. in 1940 from the University of Chicago.  Her dissertation, The Southern Negro and the Public Library: A Study of the Government and Administration of Public Library Service to Negroes in the South, was published in 1941 and was the first complete history of library access in the South, with a focus on African-American libraries. Her adviser was Carleton B. Joeckel.

Career 
She then took a position as the director of libraries at Talladega College in Alabama. In 1941 she established and became the first Dean of the School of Library Service at Atlanta University.

Gleason left Atlanta in 1946 to join her husband –  Dr. Maurice Francis Gleason – in Illinois, where he was setting up a medical practice after having served in the military. The Gleasons married in 1937 and had a daughter, Joy Gleason Carew, who is now a professor of Pan-African studies at the University of Louisville. After stints at Woodrow Wilson Junior College and Chicago Teachers College, as well as a term as a guest lecture at the University of Chicago, Gleason became an associate professor in library science at the South Chicago branch of the Illinois Teachers College in 1964.

Gleason was the first African American to serve on the board of the American Library Association from 1942 to 1946. In 1978, she was appointed to the Chicago Public Library board and became the executive director of the Chicago Black United Fund.

Legacy

Gleason died in 2009 at 100 years old.  In 2010, she was posthumously inducted into the University of Louisville's College of Arts and Sciences Hall of Honor.

The American Library Association awards the triennial Eliza Atkins Gleason Book Award in her honor for the best book written in English in the field of library history, including the history of libraries, librarianship, and book culture.

Past recipients include: Dr. Cheryl Knott, Christine Pawley, David Allan, Carl Ostrowski, and Louise Robbins.

Further reading

Notes

1909 births
2009 deaths
20th-century African-American people
20th-century African-American women
20th-century American people
21st-century African-American people
21st-century African-American women
African-American centenarians
African-American librarians
American centenarians
American librarians
American women academics
American women librarians
Chicago State University faculty
Simmons College of Kentucky people
University of California, Berkeley alumni
University of Chicago Graduate Library School alumni
University of Illinois alumni
Women centenarians